
Gmina Ładzice is a rural gmina (administrative district) in Radomsko County, Łódź Voivodeship, in central Poland.

Villages
Gmina Ładzice contains the villages and settlements of Adamów, Borki, Brodowe, Jankowice, Jedlno Drugie, Jedlno Pierwsze, Józefów, Kozia Woda, Ładzice, Radziechowice Drugie, Radziechowice Pierwsze, Stobiecko Szlacheckie, Tomaszów, Wierzbica, Wola Jedlińska and Zakrzówek Szlachecki.

Neighbouring gminas
Gmina Ładzice is bordered by the town of Radomsko and by the gminas of Dobryszyce, Kruszyna, Lgota Wielka, Nowa Brzeźnica, Radomsko and Strzelce Wielkie.

References
Polish official population figures 2006

Ladzice
Radomsko County